A brother is a male sibling.

Brother may also refer to:

Arts and entertainment

Film and television
Brother (1997 film), a Russian crime film
Brother (2000 film), a film directed by Takeshi Kitano
Brother (2022 film), a Canadian film directed by Clement Virgo
"Brother" (Star Trek: Discovery), a television episode

Music

Record labels
Brother Records, the Beach Boys' record label

Groups
Brother (Australian band), a Celtic-roots rock group
Brother (Canadian band), a rock band from Winnipeg, Manitoba
Viva Brother, originally Brother, an English rock band

Albums
Brother (Boyzone album), 2010
Brother (The Brilliance album) or the title song, 2015
Brother (Lon & Derrek Van Eaton album), 1972
Brother (Morten Harket album) or the title song, 2014
Brother (The Scene Aesthetic album), 2010
Brother, by Cry of Love, 1993

Songs
"Brother" (Alice in Chains song), 1992
"Brother" (Kodaline song), 2017
"Brother" (Little Birdy song), 2009
"Brother" (Matt Corby song), 2011
"Brother" (Needtobreathe song), 2015
"Brother" (Pearl Jam song), 2003
"Brother" (Saul song), 2019
"Brother" (Smashproof song), 2009
"Brother", by Amy Winehouse from Frank, 2003
"Brother", by Ben Haenow from Ben Haenow, 2015
"Brother", by Brett Eldredge from Brett Eldredge, 2017
"Brother", by Dark New Day from Twelve Year Silence, 2005
"Brother (On the Line)", by Dave Alvin from Romeo's Escape, 1987
"Brother", by Falling in Reverse from Just Like You, 2015
"Brother", by Funeral for a Friend from Chapter and Verse, 2015
"Brother", by Jorge Ben from A Tábua de Esmeralda, 1974
"Brother", by the Kinks from Sleepwalker, 1977
"Brother", by M.I from The Chairman, 2014
"Brother", by Murder by Death from In Bocca al Lupo, 2006
"Brother", by Orphaned Land from All Is One, 2013
"Brother", by Ronnie Radke, 2014
"Brother", by Stereophonics from Language. Sex. Violence. Other?, 2005
"Brother", by Steve Vai from Fire Garden, 1996
"Brother", by Toad the Wet Sprocket from In Light Syrup, 1995

Other uses in arts and entertainment
Brother (Final Fantasy X), a character in the video game Final Fantasy X
Brother (manga), a Japanese manga
Brother, a character from the television and book series Berenstain Bears

Roles and titles
Brother (Christian), a member of a Christian religious order
Friar or Brother, a member of one of the mendicant orders
Brother, a title usually preceding a surname as a way to address a male parishioner in some Protestant and Latter Day Saint church settings 
Brother, a member of a fraternity
Brother, a term of address for a male member of the Rainbow Family

Other uses
Brother Industries, a Japanese manufacturing company
Brother Island (disambiguation)
Brother Moth or Raphia frater, a moth of the family Noctuidae

See also
African Americans
Birth order
Brother Island (disambiguation), various islands around the world

Frater (disambiguation)
Hermano (disambiguation)